In Norse mythology, Sindri (Old Norse: , from , "spark") is the name of both a character (probably a dwarf) and a hall that will serve as a dwelling place for the souls of the virtuous after the events of Ragnarök.

A dwarf

Völuspá (37) mentions "a hall of gods, of the lineage of Sindri" located northward, in Niðavellir. There are several reasons to think that Sindri is probably a dwarf: his name is related with forging and the hall is made of gold (dwarves are said to be skillful smiths), the location of the hall is Niðavellir, which possibly means "dark fields" (dwarves live away from the sunlight).

Moreover Sindri is a dwarf in one of the manuscripts of the Prose Edda. In the Skáldskaparmál (Codex Wormianus version), Snorri Sturluson tells how the dwarves Brokkr and Eitri fashioned some of the magical objects used by the gods (the boar of Freyr, Gullinbursti, the silver ring of Odin, Draupnir, and the hammer of Thor, Mjölnir). The names of the dwarves are not given in the three other main manuscripts but in the Codex Regius, someone added more recently the names of Brokkr and Sindri. 

Sindri is also a dwarf in Þorsteins saga Víkingssonar. He helps Þorstein to defeat a powerful enemy (22-23) and to escape when he is taken prisoner (25).

A hall

In Gylfaginning, Snorri refers to Sindri as the name of a golden hall that will serve as a dwelling place for the good and righteous after Ragnarök (along with Brimir and Gimlé):

For Rudolf Simek, this seems to be a transposition of the Christian belief in Heaven, despite the fact that Sindri is in Snorri's account located in Niðafjöll, the mountains from which the corpse-sucking dragon Níðhöggr comes according to Völuspá.

Some argue that Snorri's view of Sindri as a place rather than as a character may come from a misinterpretation of the stanza of Völuspá.

Notes and references

Notes

References

 Brodeur, Arthur Gilchrist (trans.). 1916. Snorri Sturluson: The Prose Edda. New York: The American-Scandinavian Foundation.
 Falk, Hjalmar & Torp, Alf: Etymologisk ordbog over det norske og det danske sprog (Oslo 1991). .
 Faulkes, Anthony (ed.). 1998. Snorri Sturluson: Edda. Skáldskaparmál. Vol. 1, Introduction, Text and Notes. London: Viking Society for Northern Research. .
 Larrington, Carolyne (trans.). 1999. The Poetic Edda. First published in 1996. Oxford: Oxford University Press. .
 Lindow, John. 2002. Norse Mythology: A Guide to the Gods, Heroes, Rituals, and Beliefs. New York: Oxford University Press. First published in 2001 by ABC-Clio. .
 Norwegian names - http://www.norskenavn.no/navn.php?id=203
 Orchard, Andy. 2002. Cassell's dictionary of Norse myth & legend. London: Cassell. First published in 1997. .
 Simek, Rudolf. 1996. Dictionary of Northern Mythology. Translated by Angela Hall. First published by Alfred Kröner Verlag in 1984. Cambridge: D. S. Brewer. .

Norse dwarves
Locations in Norse mythology
Elves